Lac de Guéry is a lake in Puy-de-Dôme, France.

Guery